Martti Bertil Marttelin  (18 June 1897 – 1 March 1940) was a long-distance runner from Finland, who won the bronze medal in the men's marathon at the 1928 Summer Olympics. He was killed in action during World War II.

References

External links 

 

1897 births
1940 deaths
People from Nummi-Pusula
Finnish male long-distance runners
Olympic bronze medalists for Finland
Athletes (track and field) at the 1928 Summer Olympics
Olympic athletes of Finland
Medalists at the 1928 Summer Olympics
Finnish male marathon runners
Olympic bronze medalists in athletics (track and field)
Finnish military personnel killed in World War II
Sportspeople from Uusimaa